Unión Deportiva San Lorenzo is a Spanish football team based in San Lorenzo del Flumen, Lalueza, in the community of Aragón. Founded in 1968, it plays in Tercera División.

Season to season

3 seasons in Tercera División

External links
Profile at futbolaragon.com

Football clubs in Aragon
Association football clubs established in 1968
1968 establishments in Spain